"Anta Permana" is a song by Malaysian singer, Siti Nurhaliza released on 21 September 2018, as a first single from Siti Nurhaliza's 18th studio album, ManifestaSITI2020 which was released on July 3, 2020. The song was composed by Ezra Kong and Hael Husaini, its title was derived from a classic Malay word which means infinity.

A music video was filmed and released on October 4, 2018 to promote the single, which was directed by Rifaiee Omar. "Anta Permana" is the second single to be released by Siti Nurhaliza in 2018, the first of two being "Comel Pipi Merah" ("Adorable Rosy Cheeks") which was released in March to coincide with birth of Siti's newborn child, Siti Aafiyah Khalid. As of May 2019, it bagged 11 platinum certifications with more than 14 million views in YouTube.

Background and recording

Music video
The music video for "Anta Permana" was released on Siti Nurhaliza's official YouTube account on 4 October 2018. Directed by Rifaiee Omar and produced by Rio Films Sdn. Bhd. Since its release, it garnered less than 323 thousand views.

Commercial performance
"Anta Permana" successfully reached the iTunes chart, surpassing "Head Above Water" by Canadian singer, Avril Lavigne. The song’s hashtag also became trending in social media.

Format and track listing
 Digital download
 "Anta Permana" – 3:24

Release history

Charts

Awards and nominations

References

External links
 

2018 songs
2018 singles
Siti Nurhaliza songs